Vulcain is a French hard rock and heavy metal band formed in 1981.

Comeback
At the end of 2009, the band gave hopes of reviving through an announcement on its Myspace page. The trio also announced a grand tour in 2010. It also opened for Motörhead for a number of shows in 2010. On 22 April 2013, Vulcain released a new album, V8, their first in 15 years since Stoppe La Machine.

Discography
1984: Rock 'n' Roll Secours
1985: La dame de fer (EP)
1985: Desperados
1986: Big Brothers
1987: Live Force
1989: Transition
1992: Big Bang
1994: Vulcain
1998: Stoppe La Machine
2013: V8
2014: rock n roll secours 2014
2018: vinyle
Live and compilations
1996: Atomic Live (live)
1997: Compilaction (compilation)
2011: En revenant (live recorded in November 2010 plus bonus DVD of Hellfest 2010 concert)

External links
  
 Vulcain page on the French metal museum site 

1981 establishments in France
French hard rock musical groups
French heavy metal musical groups
Musical groups from Paris
Musical groups established in 1981